Cestersover is a deserted village in Warwickshire, England, now in the civil parish of Pailton.

History
It was a hamlet of Monks Kirby and was site of a watermill, a sizeable village and a chapel. The manor of Cestersover was held by the Waver (or Wara) family from at least the Norman Conquest; and the name of the village derives from Thester Wara (meaning "the Eastern" Wara).

The village was abandoned around 1467 when Henry Waver, who had made his fortune as a London draper (and was appointed a Sheriff of London) was granted permission to rebuild the ancient manor with turrets and crenelations and to enclose 500 acres of land.

Current state
Today, remains of a moat and parts of the old manor are visible.

References 

Deserted medieval villages in Warwickshire